Matías Gabriel Pardo (born 7 April 1995) is an Argentine professional footballer who plays as a winger for Patronato, on loan from Sol de América.

Career
Pardo started in the system of Deportivo Morón. He made his professional debut on 2 November 2015 during a 1–1 draw with Flandria, which was one of five appearances throughout the 2015 Primera B Metropolitana campaign. Two seasons later, Pardo scored five goals, including his career first against Acassuso on 16 September, as the club went on to win the 2016–17 title and subsequent promotion to Primera B Nacional. January 2019 saw Pardo join Paraguay's Sol de América on loan. He scored on his second appearance, netting in a 3–2 loss to Deportivo Capiatá on 27 January.

Sol de América signed Pardo permanently at the end of 2019, a campaign that saw him score four times in thirty-three league matches and make his Copa Sudamericana bow; away to Mineros de Guayana on 2 April. In July 2021, Pardo returned to Argentina, when he signed a loan deal with Patronato until the end of 2022. In the beginning of December 2021, Pardo suffered an anterior cruciate ligament injury, which was set to keep him out for at least six months.

Career statistics
.

Honours
Deportivo Morón
Primera B Metropolitana: 2016–17

References

External links

1995 births
Living people
Sportspeople from Lanús
Argentine footballers
Association football wingers
Argentine expatriate footballers
Expatriate footballers in Paraguay
Argentine expatriate sportspeople in Paraguay
Primera B Metropolitana players
Primera Nacional players
Paraguayan Primera División players
Deportivo Morón footballers
Club Sol de América footballers
Club Atlético Patronato footballers